The "Samba Gold" (Samba d'Or) is a football award given to the best Brazilian footballer in Europe, as awarded by Sambafoot. The inaugural award was made in 2008. The Samba Gold is determined by three voter panels: journalists, fellow footballers and votes from Sambafoot's online readers. In 2021, for the first time women were also selected for the award.

History
 In 2008, the inaugural winner was Milan midfielder Kaká. Manchester City's Robinho and Sevilla's Luís Fabiano placed second and third in voting, respectively. There were thirty nominations, and voting took place from 1 to 30 December. Kaká obtained 25.03% of the vote, with 14.34% for Robinho and 13.65% for Fabiano.
 In 2009, Luís Fabiano (20.91%) of Sevilla won the trophy ahead of Júlio César (17.58%) and Kaká (16.35%).
 In 2010, the prize was awarded to Maicon (12.60%) from Inter Milan running ahead of Hernanes (10.76%) and Thiago Silva (9.56%).
 In 2011, Milan defender Thiago Silva (16.33%) won the award ahead of Dani Alves from Barcelona (15.56%) and Hulk from Porto (14.41%).
 In 2012, the list of thirty candidates was announced on 26 November. Paris Saint-Germain defender Thiago Silva (17.70%) was awarded the 2012 Samba Gold on 31 December, edging out Ramires (17.04%) and Willian (10.19%).
 In 2013, Thiago Silva won for a third consecutive year, beating out Dante in second and Oscar in third.
 In 2014, Neymar won the award for the first time, receiving a record percentage of votes (29.20%).
 In 2015, Neymar won the award for a second consecutive year, surpassing the record percentage of votes he received the year prior (37.87%).
 In 2016, Philippe Coutinho won the award for the first time, ending Neymar's two year reign.
 In 2017, Neymar won the award for the third time in four years.
 In 2018, Roberto Firmino won the award for the first time.
 In 2019, Alisson Becker won the award for the first time, and became the first goalkeeper to win the award.
 In 2020, Neymar won the award for a record fourth time.
In 2021, Neymar won the fifth award. Gio Queiroz won the first women's award.

Winners

Men's football
Source:

Women's football

References

European football trophies and awards
Association football trophies and awards
Awards established in 2008